Christian Ilzer (born 21 October 1977) is an Austrian football manager who manages Sturm Graz.

Coaching career
As a teenager, three cruciate ligament injuries stopped his career and at the age of only 17, where became coach of USK Raiffeisen Puch's U17 squad. In addition to his job as an electronics technician, he started a second education as a trainer. From 2006 to 2007, he was in charge of the first team of USK Raiffeisen Puch as a playing manager. From July 2007 to July 2011, he was assistant manager under manager Bruno Friesenbichler at TSV Hartberg.

In September 2011, he worked with the Austrian U19 national team as a fitness coach, while he in the 2012–13 season also was the manager of SC Weiz. From the summer 2013, once again he became assistant manager under manager Bruno Friesenbichler at TSV Hartberg. After one season at TSV Hartberg, he joined SC Wiener Neustadt as assistant manager. On 12 November 2014, Heimo Pfeifenberger was fired at Neustadt and Ilzer took over as caretaker manager. Ilzer was in charge for one game which he won 2–0 against Wolfsberger AC, before Helgi Kolviðsson was appointed as manager on 23 November 2014. Ilzer continued his role as assistant manager at the club, before he left at the end of the season and then became manager of TSV Hartberg. He left his position already on 25 November 2015, to become assistant manager at Wolfsberger AC under Heimo Pfeifenberger.

On 29 May 2019, Ilzer was appointed manager of FK Austria Wien for the 2019–20 season.

On 17 July 2020, he was hired as manager of Sturm Graz.

Managerial statistics

References

External links
 
 Christian Ilzer at OEFB

1977 births
Living people
Austrian footballers
Association football midfielders
SC Weiz players
Austrian football managers
Austrian Football Bundesliga managers
SC Wiener Neustadt managers
FK Austria Wien managers
SK Sturm Graz managers